Mahaveeryar is a 2022 Indian Malayalam-language fantasy comedy film, scripted and directed by Abrid Shine. Produced by Pauly Jr. Pictures and Indian Movie Makers, based on a short story written by the writer M. Mukundan. Starring Nivin Pauly, Asif Ali, Shanvi Srivastava, Lal and Siddique in lead roles. The film released on 21 July 2022.

Premise 
The film focuses on justice for a woman by time-travel to a court in the 21st century through the 18th-century lens. The proceedings are snowballed by a time-traveling monk named Apoornnananda Swamikal. The film intertwines through a funny situation the monk created to set the stage for his case of interest.

Cast 
 Nivin Pauly as Swami Apoornnanandan
 Asif Ali as Veerabhadran
 Shanvi Srivastava as Devayani 
 Lal as Rudhra Mahaveera Ugrasena Maharaja 
 Siddique as MM Veerendra Kumar -Chief Judicial Magistrate
Lalu Alex as Public Prosecutor
Major Ravi as Veerabhaskar
 Mallika Sukumaran as Kaladevi
 Vijay Menon as Veerasimhan
 Krishna Prasad as Krishnanunni
 Kalabhavan Prajod as Veerachandran T.N
 Sudheer Paravoor as Babukuttan
 Natasha Singh as Veerabhadran's wife

Music
The soundtrack of Maha Veeryar is composed by Ishaan Chhabra and lyrics by B K Harinarayanan and Assanu Anna Augustine.

Track list

Production
Mahaveeryar is the third-time collaboration between Nivin and Abrid Shine, after 1983 and Action Hero Biju. The film was produced by Nivin's own production house, Pauly Jr pictures. After a decade apart, Asif and Nivin reunite in the film. They last starred together in Rajesh Pillai's Traffic and Joshiy's Sevenes. The cinematography was handled by Chandru Selvaraj and the music was composed by Ishaan Chhabra. Kannada actor Shanvi Srivastava plays the female lead.

The principal photography of the film started on 21 February 2021 with a switch-on ceremony in Rajasthan. The major portion of the film was shot in Jaipur. On 20 April 2021, principal photography of the film was completed.

Release
The film released on theaters on 21 July 2022. Subsequently, it was released digitally through Sun NXT on 10 February 2023.

Reception
The film received mixed reviews from critics. The Times of India rated the film 3.5 out of 5 stars and wrote "It is the best of times.. If you are in the mood for fun mixed with seriousness, this movie is for you" 

Perceived drawback of the film was that it does not have any transitory segments/voice-over or creative cues surrounding time travel, legal proceedings, and social justice however few critics heaped praises on the film.

The climax of the film was later changed and it was better received and understood by the audience.

References

External links
 

2022 films
Indian fantasy comedy films
2020s Malayalam-language films
Films directed by Abrid Shine